Erichsonia dentifrons is a species of beetle in the family Cerambycidae, the only species in the genus Erichsonia.

References

Parandrinae
Monotypic Cerambycidae genera